Patrick Dankwa Anin (27 July 1928 – 24 October 1999) was a foreign minister of Ghana in the Second Republic.
He died in 1999.

He was the first foreign minister to be appointed in the Progress Party government by Dr. Kofi Abrefa Busia, the Prime Minister of Ghana. He served for a few months and was replaced by Victor Owusu. He was reappointed later the same year and held the position for two years.

Anin served on a five-man Presidential Commission into Bribery and Corruption in 1970.

He also served as a Supreme Court judge from 1980 after having been nominated by President Limann.

He died on 24 October 1999.

Works

References

See also
List of judges of the Supreme Court of Ghana
Supreme Court of Ghana
Minister for Foreign Affairs (Ghana)

1928 births
1999 deaths
Foreign ministers of Ghana
Ghanaian MPs 1969–1972
Progress Party (Ghana) politicians
Justices of the Supreme Court of Ghana